Marocella is a conical shelly fossil of uncertain affinity (probably a mollusc) known from Cambrian strata of Europe, Morocco, Australia and Antarctica.

Morphology 
Limpet-like Marocella  is a low conical shell with concentric ridges that grew to a couple of centimetres in length.

Affinity 
Marocella is thought to be a mollusc, although its position within this phylum is undetermined.  Relationship to the halkieriids has also been considered.

Ecology 
Some specimens show evidence of repairing damage caused by predators.  It probably moved around on the sea floor. It was geographically widespread.

Distribution 
Fossils of Marocella have been found in:
 Shackleton Limestone, Antarctica
 Mernmerna Formation and Parara Limestone, Australia
 Jbel Wawrmast Formation, Morocco
 Sparagmite Formation, Norway
 Láncara Formation, Spain

References 

Cambrian animals
Prehistoric mollusc genera
Protostome enigmatic taxa
Fossils of Antarctica
Fossils of Australia
Cambrian animals of Africa
Fossils of Morocco
Cambrian animals of Europe
Cambrian Norway
Fossils of Norway
Fossils of Spain
Fossil taxa described in 1986
Cambrian genus extinctions